Harriet Holroyd, Countess of Sheffield (19 June 1802 – 1 January 1889), formerly Lady Harriet Lascelles, was the wife of George Holroyd, 2nd Earl of Sheffield, and a Lady of the Bedchamber to Queen Adelaide, the consort of King William IV of the United Kingdom.

She was the sixth child and eldest daughter of Henry Lascelles, 2nd Earl of Harewood, and she married the Earl of Sheffield on 6 June 1825. Her portrait soon appeared in La Belle Assemblée, the society magazine, which carried pictures of "the female nobility and ladies of distinction". It was based on an original painting by the portraitist John Jackson, which was hung at the Royal Academy.

Their children were:
Frederick Henry Stuart, Viscount Pevensey (1827–1829)
Lady Susan Harriet Holroyd (1829-1895) who married Edward Vernon Harcourt, MP, and had children
Henry Holroyd, 3rd Earl of Sheffield (1832–1909)
Douglas Edward (1834-1882), who became a barrister and died unmarried

The earl died in April 1876, aged 74, and was succeeded by his eldest surviving son, Henry. The countess died in Brighton, aged 86. She is buried in the Sheffield family mausoleum at the Church of St. Andrew and St. Mary the Virgin, Fletching, East Sussex.

References

1802 births
1889 deaths
Irish countesses
Daughters of British earls
Ladies of the Bedchamber